The 2019 Hartlepool Borough Council election took place on 2 May 2019 to elect members of Hartlepool Borough Council in England. This was on the same day as other local elections.

Ward Results

Burn Valley

De Bruce

Fens & Rossmere

Foggy Furze

Hart

Headland & Harbour

Jesmond

Manor House

Rural West

Seaton

Victoria

References

2019 English local elections
2019
2010s in County Durham